Gourdon may refer to:

Places
In France
 Arrondissement of Gourdon, in Lot, France
 Gare de Gourdon, a railway station in Gourdon, Midi-Pyrénées
 Gourdon, Alpes-Maritimes, a commune in Alpes-Maritimes
 Gourdon, Ardèche, a commune in Ardèche
 Gourdon, Lot, a commune in Lot
 Gourdon, Saône-et-Loire, a commune in Saône-et-Loire
 Gourdon-Murat, a commune in Corrèze

In Scotland
 Gourdon, Aberdeenshire, a village in Aberdeenshire

In Antarctica
 Gourdon Glacier, James Ross Island
 Gourdon Peak, Booth Island
 Gourdon Peninsula, Anvers Island

People with the surname
Jean-François Gourdon (born 1954), French rugby union player
Kevin Gourdon (born 1990), French rugby union player

See also
Gordon (disambiguation)